Phylace or Phylake (Phylakē) was a town of Molossia, in ancient Epirus, of uncertain site.

References

Populated places in ancient Epirus
Former populated places in Greece
Lost ancient cities and towns